Gilles Porte (born 11 May 1965) is a director, screenwriter, cinematographer, and assistant cameraman.

He is a member of société des auteurs et compositeurs dramatiques (SACD), of société des auteurs, compositeurs et éditeurs de musique (SACEM) and of l'association française des cinémas d'art et d'essai (AFCAE).

Life and career 
Since 1989, Gilles Porte became an assistant cameraman on the films of Jacques Audiard, Marcel Carné, Raoul Ruiz, Maroun Baghdadi, Patrice Chéreau, Costa-Gavras, and Xavier Durringer, and cinematographer on films of Abbas Fahdel, John Lvoff, Christian Philibert, Xavier Durringer, Olivier Jahan, Pierre Javaux, Jilani Saadi, and others.

In 2003 he co-directed with Yolande Moreau his first feature film, Quand la mer monte ..., for which they received the 2005 César for best first film and for Best Actress.

Filmography 
Director, screenwriter
 2005 : Quand la mer monte...

Director of photography
 2019 Who You Think I Am by Safy Nebbou
 2018 Budapest by Xavier Gens
 2016 In the Forests of Siberia by Safy Nebbou
 2015 3000 Nights by Mai Masri
 2014 L'ex de ma vie by Dorothée Sebbagh
 2011 The Conquest by Xavier Durringer
 2008 L'Aube du monde by Abbas Fahdel
 2007 Ma vie n'est pas une comédie romantique by Marc Gibaja
 2006 Les Enfants du pays by Pierre Javaux
 2004 Quand la mer monte... with Yolande Moreau
 2004 Khorma le crieur de nouvelles by Jilani Saadi
 2003 Travail d'arabe by Christian Philibert
 2001 Petits Riens by Xavier Durringer
 2001 Faites comme si je n'étais pas là by Olivier Jahan
 1999 Les Infortunes de la beauté by John Lvoff
 1998 Play by Julien Favre
 1995 Music for the movies : The Hollywood sound by Joshua Waletzky

References

External links
 
 Gilles Porte, AFC

1965 births
French film directors
French male screenwriters
Mass media people from Lyon
Living people